Northern Angami I is one of the 60 Legislative Assembly constituencies of Nagaland state in India. It is part of Kohima District and is reserved for candidates belonging to the Scheduled Tribes. It is also part of Nagaland Lok Sabha constituency.

Members of Legislative Assembly

Election results

2018

2017 By-election

2013

2008

See also 
List of constituencies of the Nagaland Legislative Assembly
 Kohima district
 Angami
 Nagaland (Lok Sabha constituency)

References 

Kohima district
Assembly constituencies of Nagaland